Noah Grand Ship In Nagoya 2022 was a professional wrestling event promoted by CyberFight's sub-brand Pro Wrestling Noah. It took place on September 25, 2022, in Nagoya, Japan, at the Aichi Prefectural Gymnasium. The event aired on CyberAgent's AbemaTV online linear television service and CyberFight's streaming service Wrestle Universe.

Background

Storylines
The event featured nine professional wrestling matches that resulted from scripted storylines, where wrestlers portrayed villains, heroes, or less distinguishable characters in the scripted events that built tension and culminated in a wrestling match or series of matches.

Event
The event started with the confrontation between rookies Kai Fujimura and Yasutaka Yano and Los Perros del Mal de Japón's Eita and Nosawa Rongai, which solded with the victory of the latter team. The second match of tge evening featured Masa Kitamiya and Yoshiki Inamura who picked up a victory against Funky Express (Akitoshi Saito and Mohammed Yone). Next, Alejandro, Extreme Tiger and Ninja Mack defeated Kongo's Hajime Ohara, Hi69 and Tadasuke. The fourth bout saw El Hijo del Dr. Wagner Jr., Jack Morris and Naomichi Marufuji defeating Daiki Inaba, Masaaki Mochizuki and Masato Tanaka in six-man tag team action. Next, Atsushi Kotoge and Seiki Yoshioka defeated Stinger stablemates Chris Ridgeway and Yoshinari Ogawa in an internal stable clash for the GHC Junior Heavyweight Tag Team Championship. Next, Satoshi Kojima and Takashi Sugiura defeated Sugiura-gun's Hideki Suzuki and Timothy Thatcher to capture the GHC Tag Team Championship. Next, Hayata defeated Yo-Hey to secure his fifth consecutive defense of the GHC Junior Heavyweight Championship. The semi main event saw Kazuyuki Fujita and Keiji Muto defeating Kongo's Katsuhiko Nakajima and Masakatsu Funaki in tag team action.

The main event portraited the confrontation between Kenoh and the winner of the 2022 edition of the N-1 Victory Kaito Kiyomiya who won his right to challenge for Kenoh's GHC Heavyweight Championship. The bout concluded with Kiyomiya's win, ending Kenho's reign at 71 days and stopping him from securing his first defense.

Results

References

External links
Pro Wrestling Noah official website

Pro Wrestling Noah
CyberAgent
2022 in professional wrestling
December 2022 events in Japan
Pro Wrestling Noah shows
Events in Nagoya
Professional wrestling in Japan